The III CELAC summit or 2015 CELAC summit was the third ordinary heads of state summit of the Community of Latin American and Caribbean States. It was held on 28 and 29 January 2015 in San José, Costa Rica.

References

External links 
 Official declaration (Spanish)

2015 conferences
2015 in international relations
2015 in South America
2015 in the Caribbean
Diplomatic conferences in Costa Rica
Summit,2015
January 2015 events in South America